Tamil Rockerz is an Indian Tamil-language streaming television series written and directed by Arivazhagan Venkatachalam under the banner of AVM. The film stars Arun Vijay and Vani Bhojan. The series' story is based on the torrent site Tamil Rockers.

Plot 
Rudra to head a special team, consisting of cyber forensic officer Sandhya, cyber crime SI Bhanu  and inspector Nelson, to find Tamil Rockerz and prevent Garuda from being leaked online.

Cast 
 Arun Vijay as Rudhra
 Vani Bhojan as Sandhya Venugopal
 Iswarya Menon as Keerthi
 Vinodhini Vaidyanathan as Bhanu
 Vinod Sagar as Nelson
 Azhagam Perumal as Madhi
 Marimuthu as Madhi assistant

Episodes

Reception 
A critic from The Hindu opined that "'Tamil Rockerz' season 1 review: Predictable storytelling that wastes potential". A critic from The Indian Express wrote that "The creators of Tamil Rockerz deserve credit for turning the gaze inwards. The series shines the light on the moral and ethical bankruptcy of the industry that breeds all sorts of problems". A critic from Hindustan Times said that "Arivazhagan's  has the potential, but the treatment of the story is so generic that it fails to keep one invested". Arun Anthony of Deccan Herald gave the film 2 out of 5 stars and said "The story is muddled with many subplots and overly emotional sequences that make the viewer lose connection with the narrative."

References

External links 
 

SonyLIV original programming
Tamil-language web series
Tamil-language thriller television series
2022 Tamil-language television series debuts
2022 Tamil-language television series endings